Chile–Colombia relations refer to the historical and current relationship between Chile and Colombia. Both two nations were once part of Spain, having shared cultural and linguistic tie developed from Spanish rule, and also embracing democracy. Therefore, two countries enjoy a close tie and fond between each other. Both are members of the Community of Latin American and Caribbean States, Organization of American States, OECD, Pacific Alliance and the United Nations.

Historical
As both nations were colonized by Spanish Empire, Chile and Colombia developed a strong tie based on Hispanic heritages over two nations. Both two nations later were active at the Latin American wars of independence from Spain, and as such, gave such revered heroes like Bernardo O'Higgins and Simón Bolívar.

In the later part, Chilean stability had been an attractive destination for Colombian immigrants who wanted to escape from the country's instability, especially during the Colombian conflict.

Chile had protected Colombian sovereign border during the Panama crisis of 1885, when the United States sent a short-lived military intervention. Colombia had remained neutral during the War of the Pacific.

Modern relations
Trade between two countries, however, have been still modest level as for 2009, however both have expressed to expand the relationship into a larger level.

There are over 20.000 Colombian nationals living in Chile. However, several concerns, such as racism, still exists in Chile towards Colombian immigrants, as Chile has a higher economic development comparing to Colombia.

Cultural relations
A Chilean famous march song, March to the Seventh Line, is widely played by the Colombian Armed Forces band as part of strong friendship between Chile and Colombia.

Resident diplomatic missions
 Chile has an embassy in Bogotá.
 Colombia has an embassy in Santiago and a consulate-general in Antofagasta.

See also 
 Foreign relations of Chile
 Foreign relations of Colombia

References

 
Colombia
Chile